Yugoslavia made its Paralympic Games début at the 1972 Summer Paralympics in Heidelberg. It did not compete at the 1976 Summer Games, but did take part in the inaugural Winter Paralympics that year in Örnsköldsvik. In 1980, 1984 and 1988, it took part in both the Summer and Winter Games.

Following the breakup of Yugoslavia, the proclamation of the Federal Republic of Yugoslavia as a successor state uniting Serbia and Montenegro was not immediately recognised by the International Paralympic Committee. In accordance with United Nations Security Council Resolution 757, Yugoslavia was barred from competing at the 1992 Summer Games as a national delegation. Yugoslav athletes competed, instead, as Independent Paralympic Participants. Yugoslavia was subsequently recognised once more, and returned to compete at the 1996 Summer Games. Absent from the 1998 Winter Games, it made its final appearance under the name "Yugoslavia" at the 2000 Summer Paralympics, before competing as Serbia and Montenegro at the 2004 Summer Games. The 2006 split in the union led to Serbia and Montenegro competing separately from then on. Kosovo is expected to make its Paralympic debut at the Paralympics in Paris 2024.

Although Yugoslavia never hosted the Paralympic Games, it did organise the first disabled skiing competition as an Olympic demonstration event when it hosted the 1984 Winter Olympics in Sarajevo.

Yugoslav athletes won a total of 76 medals at the Paralympics, of which 75 at the Summer Games. 21 of these were gold medals (all at the Summer Games).

Timeline of participation at the Paralympic Games

Medal tables

These tables include every participation by “Yugoslavia”, as recognised by the International Paralympic Committee.

Medals by Summer Games

Medals by Winter Games

Medalists

Summer Paralympics

Winter Paralympics

See also
 Yugoslavia at the Olympics

References